Diane Mazloum (born 1980) is a French-Lebanese writer. Her novels are set against the history or present in Lebanon.

Life and education 
Diane Mazloum was born in 1980, in Paris, to Lebanese parents who fled from the country because of the Lebanese Civil War. She grew up in Rome and studied astrophysics at Pierre and Marie Curie University in Paris, then moved to Lebanon to study art and design at the American University of Beirut. Later, Mazloum returned to Paris, but she was in Beirut during the 2020 explosion.

Career 
Mazloum debuted in 2009 with a graphic novel Nucleus en plein cœur de Beyrouth City. Five years later, she published her first novel Beyrouth, la nuit. Her next novel, L’âge d’or, was awarded the Prix Amic by the Académie Française and the Prix France-Liban, while Une piscine dans le désert (2020) was nominated for Prix Renaudot, Prix Femina and Prix Médicis. Her writing deals with the past and the present of Lebanon.

Works 

Nucleus en plein cœur de Beyrouth City, 2009
Beyrouth, la nuit, 2014
L'âge d'or, 2018
Une piscine dans le désert, 2020
Le musée national, 2021

References 

1980 births
Living people
21st-century French women writers
21st-century Lebanese women writers
Lebanese women novelists
Lebanese novelists
21st-century French novelists
Writers from Paris